Janez Dolnitscher  was a politician of the late 17th century in Slovenia, when the country was under the Holy Roman Empire. He became mayor of Ljubljana in 1692. He was succeeded by Matija Di Georgio in 1697.

References

Mayors of places in the Holy Roman Empire
Mayors of Ljubljana
Year of birth missing
Year of death missing
17th-century Slovenian politicians